The 1971–72 Montenegrin Republic League was 27th season of Montenegrin Republic League. Season started in August 1971 and finished in May 1972.

Season 

On season 1971–72, in Montenegrin Republic League participated 12 teams. Among the teams which didn't play during the previous season were three best teams from Regional leagues - Ibar, Brskovo and Grafičar.
After 22 weeks, the title won Jedinstvo. Second-placed was Rudar with equal number of points as Arsenal, but with better goal difference. So, Jedinstvo and Rudar gained promotion to Yugoslav Second League.
Two lowest ranked teams - Brskovo and Kom were relegated to Regional leagues (fourth level).

Table

Higher leagues 
On season 1971–72, six Montenegrin teams played in higher leagues of SFR Yugoslavia. Sutjeska was a member of 1971–72 Yugoslav First League. Five other teams (Budućnost, Lovćen, OFK Titograd, Bokelj and Iskra) participated in 1971–72 Yugoslav Second League.

See also 
 Montenegrin Republic League
Montenegrin Republic Cup (1947–2006)
Montenegrin clubs in Yugoslav football competitions (1946–2006)
Montenegrin Football Championship (1922–1940)

References 

Montenegrin Republic League